Events in the year 1885 in Japan.

Incumbents
Monarch: Emperor Meiji
Prime Minister: Itō Hirobumi (starting December 22)

Governors
Aichi Prefecture: Renpei Kunisada then Minoru Katsumata
Akita Prefecture: Akagawa
Aomori Prefecture: Kyusei Fukushima
Ehime Prefecture: Shinpei Seki
Fukui Prefecture: Tsutomu Ishiguro
Fukushima Prefecture: Kinichi Akashi
Gifu Prefecture: Toshi Kozaki
Gunma Prefecture: Sato Atasesan
Hiroshima Prefecture: Senda Sadaaki
Ibaraki Prefecture: Hitomi Katsutaro then Shima
Iwate Prefecture: Shoichiro Ishii
Kanagawa Prefecture: Baron Tadatsu Hayashi
Kochi Prefecture: Yoshiaki Tonabe
Kumamoto Prefecture: Yoshiaki Tonabe
Kyoto Prefecture: Baron Utsumi Tadakatsu
Mie Prefecture: Baron Utsumi Tadakatsu then Ishii Kuni
Miyagi Prefecture: Matsudaira Masanao
Miyazaki Prefecture: Teru Tananbe 
Nagano Prefecture: Baron Seiichiro Kinashi
Niigata Prefecture: Nagayama Sheng Hui then Shinozaki Goro
Oita Prefecture: Ryokichi Nishimura
Okinawa Prefecture: Sutezo Nishimura then Sadakiyo Osako 
Osaka Prefecture: Tateno Tsuyoshi
Saga Prefecture: Kamata
Saitama Prefecture: Kiyohide Yoshida
Shimane Prefecture: Tamechika Fujikawa then Sada Kotedayasu
Tochigi Prefecture: Mishi Michitsune then Sukeo Kabayama
Tokyo: Earl Kensho Yoshikawa then Hiroshi Watanabe
Toyama Prefecture: Kunishige Masafuni
Yamagata Prefecture: Orita Hirauchi then Shibahara Sum

Births
January 25 - Kitahara Hakushū (d. 1942), poet and author
November 8 - Tomoyuki Yamashita (d. 1946), World War II general

References

 
1880s in Japan
Japan
Years of the 19th century in Japan